Gregory Day is an Australian novelist, poet, and musician.

Life

Gregory Day is a novelist, poet, essayist and musician based in Victoria, Australia. He is well known for his Mangowak novels, which document generational, demographic, and environmental change on the 21st-century coast of southwest Victoria, Australia, and also for novels such as Archipelago of Souls and A Sand Archive, which explore the possibilities of finding the right balance between nature and culture through investigating the experience of the Australian character abroad. He has been much acclaimed for his place-based nature essays, and also for his musical compositions and field recordings, notably his settings and singing of the poetry of William Butler Yeats on the album The Black Tower, and his project The Flash Road, which narrates in song the building of the Great Ocean Road in southwest Victoria in the years following The Great War. Day is also the co-founder with artist and book designer, Sian Marlow, of the fine press limited edition literature and music publisher, Merrijig Word & Sound Co.

Awards and nominations

Commonwealth Writers Prize, South East Asia and South Pacific Region, Best First Book, 2006: The Patron Saint of Eels — shortlisted 
Australian Literature Society Gold Medal, 2006: The Patron Saint of Eels — winner
New South Wales Premier's Literary Awards, Christina Stead Prize for Fiction, 2008: Ron McCoy's Sea of Diamonds: A Novel — shortlisted
Elizabeth Jolley Short Story Prize, 2011: The Neighbour's Beans — winner
Manly Artist Book Award, 2017: A Smile at Arm's Length — winner
Tasmanian Premier's Literary Prizes, Tasmania Book Prize, 2017: Archipelago of Souls — shortlisted
Nature Conservancy, Australia Nature Writing Prize, 2019: Summer On The Painkalac — shortlisted
Miles Franklin Award, 2019: A Sand Archive — shortlisted
Patrick White Literary Award, 2020 — winner
Nature Conservancy Australia Nature Writing Prize, 2021 – winner

Bibliography

Novels
 The Patron Saint of Eels (2005)
Ron McCoy's Sea of Diamonds (2007)
The Grand Hotel (2010)
Archipelago of Souls (2015)
A Sand Archive (2018)
The Bell of the World (2023)

Essays
Words Are Eagles: Selected Writings on the Nature and Language of Place (2022)

Artist Books
visitors - with Jiri Tibor Novak (2012)
A Smile At Arm's Length — with Jiri Tibor Novak (2016)

Poetry
 Six Different Ways (1999) — with Kieran Carroll and Michael Farrell etc.
Trace (in collaboration with photographer Robert Ashton) (2003)
A Smile At Arm's Length (2016)

Music
Untitled Red: No Evangelism (1992)
Barroworn: Mangowak Days (1995) 
The Black Tower: Songs From The Poetry of W. B. Yeats (1998)
 Trace soundtrack with Silver Ray (2003)
The Flash Road: Scenes From The Building Of The Great Ocean Road (2005)
The Ampliphones: Emotional Patterns of a New Climate (2015)
Rejectamenta: From Real to Imagined Seaweed (2021)

Interviews
 "ABC Radio National Books and Arts"  July 2015
 "ABC Radio National Book Show"  - 21 May 2008

References

21st-century Australian novelists
Australian male novelists
Australian poets
Australian songwriters
Living people
ALS Gold Medal winners
21st-century Australian male writers
 Year of birth missing (living people)